Mycolicibacterium aichiense (formerly Mycobacterium aichiense) is a species of bacteria from the phylum Actinomycetota that was first isolated from soil and from human sputum. It produces pigments when grow in the dark and grows rapidly at 25–37 °C on Ogawa egg medium or Sauton agar medium.

References

Acid-fast bacilli
aichiense
Bacteria described in 1981